The 2024 United States House of Representatives elections in Massachusetts will be held on November 5, 2024, to elect the nine U.S. representatives from the State of Massachusetts, one from all nine of the state's congressional districts. The elections will coincide with the 2024 U.S. presidential election, as well as other elections to the House of Representatives, elections to the United States Senate, and various state and local elections.

District 2

The 2nd congressional district is in central Massachusetts and includes Worcester. The incumbent is Democrat Jim McGovern, who was re-elected with 66.2% of the vote in 2022.

Democratic primary

Candidates

Potential
Jim McGovern, incumbent U.S. Representative

Republican primary

Candidates

Potential
Karyn Polito, former Lieutenant Governor of Massachusetts (2015–2023)

General election

Predictions

District 9

The 9th district encompasses Cape Cod and the South Shore, and extends westward into New Bedford and surrounding suburbs. The incumbent is Democrat Bill Keating, who was re-elected with 59.1% of the vote in 2022.

Democratic primary

Candidates

Potential
Bill Keating, incumbent U.S. Representative

Republican primary

Candidates

Potential
Karyn Polito, former Lieutenant Governor of Massachusetts (2015–2023)

General election

Predictions

References

2024
Massachusetts
United States House of Representatives